Ivan II Ivanovich the Fair (30 March 1326 – 13 November 1359) was the Grand Prince of Moscow and Grand Prince of Vladimir in 1353. Until that date, he had ruled the towns of Ruza and Zvenigorod. He was the second son of Ivan Kalita, and succeeded his brother Simeon the Proud, who died of the Black Death.

Reign
Upon succeeding his brother and because of increased civil strife among the Golden Horde, Ivan briefly toyed with the idea of abandoning traditional Moscow allegiance to the Mongols and allying himself with Lithuania, a growing power in the west. This policy was quickly abandoned and Ivan asserted his allegiance to the Golden Horde.

Contemporaries described Ivan as a pacific, apathetic ruler, who didn't flinch even when Algirdas of Lithuania captured his father-in-law's capital, Bryansk. He also allowed Oleg of Riazan to burn villages on his territory. However, Orthodox churchmen aided in consolidating the power of the Grand Prince. He received much aid from the capable Metropolitan Alexius. Like his brother, Ivan II was not as successful as his father or grandfather with regard to territorial expansion. Nevertheless, he was able to annex areas southwest of Moscow, including the areas of Borovsk, and Vereya.

He is buried in the Cathedral of the Archangel Michael in Moscow.

Marriages and children
Ivan was married twice. In 1341, Ivan married his first wife Fedosia Dmitrievna of Bryansk. She was a daughter of Dmitry Romanovich, Prince of Bryansk. She died childless in autumn 1342.

Ivan remained a widower for three years. In 1345, Ivan married his second wife, Alexandra Vassilievna Velyaminova. She was a daughter of Vasily Velyaminov, a mayor of Moscow. They had at least four children:

 Dmitri Donskoi (12 October 1350 – 19 May 1389). His successor in the Grand Duchy of Moscow.
 A daughter married Prince Bobrok of Volhynia.
 Ivan Ivanovich, Prince of Zvenigorod (c. 1356 – October 1364).
 Maria Ivanovna.

See also
 Bibliography of Russian history (1223–1613)

References

External links
His listing , along with his children, in "Medieval lands" by Charles Cawley.

1326 births
1359 deaths
14th-century Grand Princes of Moscow
14th-century Russian princes
Grand Princes of Moscow
Grand Princes of Vladimir
Eastern Orthodox monarchs
Rurik dynasty
Yurievichi family